Army and warfare made their first appearance in Vietnamese history during the 3rd millennium BC. Throughout thousands of years, wars played a great role in shaping the identity and culture of people inhabited the land which is modern day Vietnam. Vietnam is regarded as one of the most militaristic countries in Southeast Asia, there is even a higher level belief Vietnam might be the most militaristic nation in Southeast Asia, and one of Asia and the world's most militaristic countries. The military history of the Socialist Republic of Vietnam began when Japan invaded French Indochina and soon defeated the French resistance. Since then, Vietnam has fought in many conflicts in Indochina.

Hong Bang period 

Weapons are the most common Bronze Age artifacts found so far. The presence of arms in many tombs of upper-class people indicates the existence of a warrior class in Dong Son society during the Hong Bang period.

Medieval period 

Warfare during this 500-year period (938–1407) was characterized by a combination of amphibious and land assaults. Owing to the fragmented terrain and long coast line of the country, maneuvers by boats were favoured by most military forces who had fought in Vietnam. Small-scale coastal and border raids were frequent. Domestic violence as well as foreign incursions were equally common. It is possible that during this period that Vietnam was at its height of power, first by defeating the Southern Han in 938 AD. Then they emerged and decisively defeated the neighboring Dali, Khmer Empire, Champa, and the Song.

Mongol invasions of Vietnam 

 

In the 13th century, the Vietnamese defeated the Great Yuan dynasty of the Mongol empire three times, and it was seen as one of the most famous historical victories of Vietnam. In an extent, the Vietnamese successful repelling of Mongol invasions, had been recognized as the main factor which would have saved all Southeast Asia from Mongols.

Cham–Vietnamese wars

Early modern period 

Vietnam adopted firearms from the Ming dynasty in the late 14th century. The conquest of Champa was contributed to Later Lê dynasty firearm advantage.

Around 15th-16th century, firearms started to gain dominance on Vietnam's battlefields. Rivaling feudal lords were quick to adopt these new deadly weapons. Tactics were changed to accommodate guns and cannons and soon the country had as many guns as it could afford. Throughout the time, the Vietnamese state also annexed the Southern region of the declining Khmer Empire which would become Vietnam today.

Tây Sơn period 

Future Emperor Quang Trung, along with Nguyễn Nhạc and Nguyễn Lữ, had successfully united all Vietnam after a century being divided between the Trịnh Lords and Nguyễn Lords. Following with it, the Vietnamese also successfully crushed the Siamese at the Battle of Rạch Gầm-Xoài Mút and decisively, the Battle of Ngọc Hồi-Đống Đa against Qing force. Thus, this had been also registered as Vietnamese military victories.

Nguyễn period

French invasion of Indochina

Japanese invasion of French Indochina 

The Japanese invasion of French Indochina was a successful Japanese campaign against the French colonial power in Southeast Asia. The invasion was a part of a greater strategy which was meant to surround and isolate China. Following the fall of the French in Indochina, Việt Minh began its campaign against the Japanese occupiers, using guerrilla tactics. The conflict ended when Japan surrendered to the United States, following the bombing of Hiroshima and Nagasaki.

Socialist period 

First Indochina War
Following the allied victory in World War II, France was hoping to regain control over its former colony in Indochina, which was also claimed by the Viet Minh. France attempted to invade and reoccupy Vietnam, but after nine years of war and the subsequent military defeat in The Battle of Dien Bien Phu, the French gave up and retreated from Indochina. This resulted in Indochina being divided into four countries under the terms of the 1954 Geneva Accords: North Vietnam, South Vietnam, Laos and Kampuchea.

Laotian Civil War
The Laotian Civil War began in 1953 when war escalated between the government forces and Pathet Lao, which received support from North Vietnam and China. In addition to their desire to support the communist movement in Laos, Vietnam also wanted to control the strategically important areas in Laos. The conflict ended in 1975, when Pathet Lao seized power in Laos, ending the Kingdom of Laos.

North Vietnamese invasion of Laos
The North Vietnamese invasion of Laos begun in 1958 as a mixed result of boundary disputes and the Hanoi Regime's desire to control the Ho Chi Minh-path. The invasion was a success, and North Vietnam secured control over important parts of Laos.

Vietnam War

The Vietnam War started with the breach of the intended general election to unite the country by South Vietnam and the Việt Cộng initiation of a guerrilla war in the south. This led to an American intervention which lasted until 1973, when they withdrew their forces from Vietnam following a peace treaty. The war went on, and in 1975 North Vietnam emerged victorious.

Cambodian Civil War
The Cambodian Civil War was a mixed result of the Khmer Rouge's desire to establish a communist regime in Cambodia, eventually dragging Cambodia into the Vietnam War due to the North Vietnamese support for the Khmer Rouge and their use of Cambodian soil to stage attacks into South Vietnam. The US heavily bombed PVA, VC and Khmer Rouge position in Cambodia. Khmer Rouge was aided militarily by the North Vietnam and the Viet Cong, and won the war in 1975.

Hmong Insurgency
When the Laotian Civil War ended in 1975, the government of Laos started to persecute the Hmong-tribes, who had been fighting alongside the United States in the Vietnam War. Vietnam has participated in the persecution, which has led to thousands of Hmong fleeing to the United States and Thailand. Although the Hmong no longer poses a military threat to the government of Laos, they are still under suspect by Laotian authorities.

Cambodian-Vietnamese War
When the Vietnam War ended, the Khmer Rouge, which then controlled Cambodia, claimed the Mekong Delta being a historical part of Cambodia. When Vietnam refused to cede the delta to Cambodia, the Khmer Rouge responded by conducting several border skirmishes, infiltrations and sabotage. By the late 1978, Vietnam invaded Cambodia, and after two weeks of fighting, Vietnamese forces captured Pnomh Penh. Vietnam occupied Cambodia until 1988.

Vietnamese border raids in Thailand
The Vietnamese border raids in Thailand were a Vietnamese attempt to stop the Khmer Rouge from using Thailand as a base when fighting against Vietnam and the Vietnamese-friendly regime in Pnomh Penh. This nearly led to a war, as Vietnamese troops often penetrated into Thai territory, chasing Khmer Rouge guerrillas. This often resulted in clashes between Vietnamese and Thai forces. However, this never led to a war.

Sino-Vietnamese War
In response to Vietnam's 1978 invasion and occupation of Cambodia (which ended the rule of the Chinese-backed Khmer Rouge), the People's Republic of China launched a brief punitive military campaign against Vietnam, lasting from 17 February to 16 March. Chinese forces entered northern Vietnam and captured several cities near the border. On 6 March 1979, China declared that the gate to Hanoi was open and that their punitive mission had been achieved, before withdrawing their troops from Vietnam. Both China and Vietnam claimed victory in the war; as Vietnamese troops remained in Cambodia until 1989, it can be said that China was unsuccessful in their goal of dissuading Vietnam from involvement in Cambodia.

Sino-Vietnamese border conflicts 1979–1990
After China withdrew from Vietnam in 1979, border conflicts continued to occur. These conflicts often involved cross-border raids and battles, and claimed thousands of lives from both sides. The conflict subsided in 1990, without an outbreak of war.

Thai–Laotian Border War
The Thai–Laotian Border War began in 1987, when Thailand invaded parts of Laos claimed by the former. Laos responded with force, and the Thai forces were pushed back to the border. During this brief war, Vietnam reinforced its communist ally, and helped them in their war against Thailand. The war ended with a ceasefire in 1988, when Laos had successfully regained all lost ground, and pushed the Thai forces out of the disputed territory.

Notable commanders 
Trưng Sisters
Bà Triệu
Bùi Thị Xuân
Lý Bí
Triệu Việt Vương
Ngô Quyền
Đinh Bộ Lĩnh
Lê Hoàn
Lý Thường Kiệt
Trần Hưng Đạo: notable for the repellion of Mongol invasions to Vietnam twice
Trần Quang Khải
Trần Khánh Dư
Lê Lai: the General who disguised as Lord Lê Lợi against the Ming
Lê Lợi
Nguyễn Huệ, Nguyễn Nhạc and Nguyễn Lữ
Trương Định
Võ Nguyên Giáp

Gallery 

Pictures of Vietnamese weapons from the Pacification of Tonkin were taken by westerners.

Replicas of traditional bladed weapons serve as decorations in Vietnam.

Notes

References

Cœdès, George. (1966). The Making of South East Asia (illustrated, reprint ed.). University of California Press. . Retrieved 7 August 2013.

 
History of Vietnam